Snir Yamin is a singer-songwriter originally from Tel Aviv, Israel.

Biography
Snir Yamin started his music career in 2006. Together with his high-school band, they first performed in multiple clubs in the Sharon District of Israel. The band's debut concert took place at a club named "Muza", which was one of the biggest clubs in the Central District of Israel. Snir and the band decided to break up after a year of work.

In 2009, after 3 years of life experiences, writing, and composing music, Snir was invited to take part in a unique production in Israel. It was an Acoustic Night Showcase at the biggest Rock venue in Israel – The Barby Club. Snir performed as a headliner together with three bands. In the same year, Snir has signed a collaboration contract with the biggest cellular company in Israel, Cellcom. The collaboration allowed the cellular company to distribute and use for commercial and promotional contents Snir Yamin's debut single, Yofi Shel Sheket.

In 2010, Snir Yamin has started to perform his original acoustic songs. In the same year, Yamin's released two singles, produced by Reuven Hayun. Those singles were played on Israeli Radio Stations and TV programs such as Reshet Gimel, Kol Israel, Galatz, and 88 FM. The singles were also reviewed in Israeli music magazines, both online and in print. Later that year, Snir was invited by NMC Music Entertainment to take part in a charity benefit concert at the Baroque Club in the city of Be'er Sheva, together with other Israeli renowned artists such as Hadag Nachash, Efrat Gosh, Dudu Tassa, Israeli Idol winners, and Dana Lapidot. It was one of the biggest charity events in Israel in front of 6,000 people.

In 2011, Snir Yamin's got his first recording contract from an England music producer who lives and works in London. Snir traveled with the production crew to London for two months to track his first extended play (EP). The recording process took place at the prestigious SNAP! Studios. The EP was released in September 2013 by Nana Disc. In the same year, Snir Yamin took part in the biggest yearly event of Israel Independence Day, called Rock Atzmaut. It was a two million dollar investment, which starred top Israeli Rock musicians.

In 2013, Snir traveled to New York City to cut a master of his first EP. titled Urban Stories. On that trip, Snir got into a recording studio in the East Village of Manhattan, called The Cutting Room. Snir released a four-track EP for an international audience called Urban Stories, which received lots much attention from the media in ways of reviews, features, interviews, sells and ratings. The EP was released in September 2013, with the assistance of Nana Disc Music Label in Israel.

Urban Stories EP, scored number one on Album Of The Year Users Picks Chart for the best album of 2013.

In November 2013, Snir Yamin released his first fully produced music video for his single "Stay", out of Urban Stories EP. The music video, directed by Sahar Golovaty, is starred by Snir Yamin alongside the Israeli Model and Actress Ann Zelinger.

In 2015, Snir released his second music video, Taking, which was created by Youtube videos footage from around the world. Courtesy of CNN, RT, FOX News, Sky News, FIDF, and others. At the same time, Taking has charted in the Top 5 on the Israeli iTunes Top Songs Music Chart.

Earlier in 2016, Snir Yamin released his second international EP, titled Concrete City. The second single off the EP, You and I, was charted to number 36 on the Israeli iTunes Top 200 Songs Music Chart.

In September 2018, Snir Yamin released his first single off a self-titled debut LP. The single, down the line, was featured in Times Square, received numerous media attention around the world, in publications such as Essential Pop, A&R Factory among others, and charted to number 2 on the Israeli iTunes top 200 Chart. The lyric music video received over 80,000 views on YouTube in a short period.

In June 2019, Snir Yamin released his self-titled debut LP.

Discography
 Urban Stories EP (2013)
 Yofi Shel Sheket (2014)
 Concrete City EP (2016)
 Snir Yamin (2019)

Music videos

References

External links

Israeli record producers
21st-century Israeli male singers
Living people
1990 births